Thurne is a small village and civil parish in the English county of Norfolk.

The village's name means 'Thorn-bush'.

For the purposes of local government, the parish falls within the district of Great Yarmouth.

The village lies at the end of Thurne Dyke, a popular mooring, not least because of Thurne windpump, which became known locally as Morse's Mill, Bob Morse, who purchased it to prevent it from being sold for scrap. It is a popular object for photography, after being painted white. There is a second windpump across the river, the St Benet's Level windpump.

Thurne is also home to the well-respected sailing club Theta, which has been accommodated here for over half a century and is now part of the village's character. Free moorings are available for three boats at Thurne mouth. From there, it is a short walk to the village, with a large pub, the Lion Inn,  and a small shop.

The Weavers' Way, a long-distance footpath, runs through the village.

Notes

External links

.
Information from Genuki Norfolk on Thurne.

Villages in Norfolk
Civil parishes in Norfolk
Borough of Great Yarmouth